Gaspard et Lisa, more commonly known as Gaspard and Lisa, are two fictional characters appearing in a series of children's books created by wife and husband Anne Gutman and Georg Hallensleben.

The books center on two friends: Gaspard (black with a blue scarf) and Lisa (white with a red scarf) who go on various adventures. Gaspard, Lisa and their family members are drawn as animals, but live among humans in Paris, with the titular characters attending an ordinary school alongside human characters. Officially, Gaspard and Lisa are neither dogs nor rabbits.

Book series
Gutman and Hallensleben published the first "Gaspard et Lisa" book in French in 1999. The characters became hugely popular in Japan following the introduction of Japanese translations of the books in 2001.

Below is a list of the books in the series. The books have also been translated into fifteen languages.

Merchandising
Plushes of Gaspard and Lisa were produced by Sun Arrow. The toys were approved by the characters' creators.

Sony acquired the merchandising rights to the franchise in 2012.

TV adaptation

Production company Chorion produced animated cartoons based on the books. The TV series debuted in 2010.

See also

References

Books about dogs
Children's books about friendship
Children's fiction books
Fictional duos
Literary characters introduced in 1999
Literary duos
Series of children's books